Heong Peng or Heong Peah means fragrant pastries in English. These pastries, which resemble slightly flattened balls, contain a sweet sticky filling made from malt and shallots, which is covered by a flaky baked crust and garnished with sesame seeds on the surface. They are available in many stores around Ipoh, where tourists also buy them as souvenirs. Heong Peng are also available in other parts of Malaysia and Singapore.

Heong Peng is popular with the Malaysian Chinese community, especially those in Northern Peninsular Malaysia.

Packaging 
In addition to the original maltose taste, the Malaysian cakes are also available in various flavors such as durian, coffee and pandan leaves. The cake shops in Penang, Kedah, Malacca and Johor have also started selling Heong Peah cakes, becoming one of the local mainstream traditional pastries. The cake easily becomes wet and soft, so the local shops sell the cake in small units, usually in packs of eight or ten. Due to the low revenue, cheap red plastic bags are used to package the cake. On the days when these shops bake Heong Peng cakes, they will hang signboards at the door to let the locals smell the cakes in order to entice them to buy them.

See also
 List of pastries

References

External links
 Yee Hup - Gunung Rapat Hiong Piah

Malaysian pastries
Ipoh